Daniela Macarena López (born 9 April 1997) is a Chilean tennis player.

López has a career high WTA singles ranking of 960, achieved on 29 January 2018. She also has a career high WTA doubles ranking of 719, achieved on 30 October 2017. López has won one ITF doubles title.
 
López made her Fed Cup debut for Chile in 2018.

ITF finals

Doubles (1–0)

External links
 
 
 

1997 births
Living people
Chilean female tennis players
21st-century Chilean women